Jaime Bladimir Cubías Alvarado (born Marzo 10, 1974 in San Sebastián, El Salvador) is a retired Salvadoran football player.

Club career
A rather short defender, Cubías made his debut in the Primera División de Fútbol de El Salvador at 16 years, playing for FAS. He won 2 championship medals with FAS in 1996 and 1997. He also played for the other big teams in the country, Luis Ángel Firpo, Isidro Metapán, Águila and Alianza. In 2005, he terminated his contract with San Salvador F.C. after a dispute over salary payments.

International career
Nicknamed el Peluca (the wig), Cubías made his debut for El Salvador in a November 1995 friendly match against Yugoslavia and has earned a total of 25 caps, scoring 2 goals. He has represented his country in 2 FIFA World Cup qualification matches and played at the 1995 and 2001 UNCAF Nations Cups and at the 1996 and 2002 CONCACAF Gold Cups.

His final international was a January 2002 CONCACAF Gold Cup match against the United States.

International goals
Scores and results list El Salvador's goal tally first.

References

External links

1974 births
Living people
People from San Vicente Department
Association football central defenders
Salvadoran footballers
El Salvador international footballers
1996 CONCACAF Gold Cup players
2001 UNCAF Nations Cup players
2002 CONCACAF Gold Cup players
C.D. FAS footballers
C.D. Luis Ángel Firpo footballers
A.D. Isidro Metapán footballers
C.D. Águila footballers
Alianza F.C. footballers
San Salvador F.C. footballers
C.D. Chalatenango footballers